Raymond J. Moyer (March 27, 1926 – September 27, 2014) was an American businessman and politician.

Born in Milwaukee, Wisconsin, Moyer moved to Rochester, Wisconsin in 1940 and graduated from the Racine County School of Agriculture. He served in the United States Army during World War II with the military police. Moyer owned the Moyer Motor Company Garage in Rochester, Wisconsin and was also in the insurance business. He served on the Waterford Grade School and High School Board of Education. Moyer also served on the Racine County Board of Supervisors. In 1983, Moyer served in the Wisconsin State Assembly and was a Democrat. Moyer died at Wisconsin Veterans Home-Boland Hall in Milwaukee, Wisconsin.

Notes

1926 births
2014 deaths
Politicians from Milwaukee
People from Rochester, Wisconsin
Military personnel from Milwaukee
Businesspeople from Milwaukee
County supervisors in Wisconsin
School board members in Wisconsin
Democratic Party members of the Wisconsin State Assembly
20th-century American businesspeople
United States Army personnel of World War II
American military police officers